Borja is both a surname and a male given name of Spanish origin. January 11 is the international Borja day. Notable people with the name include:

Surname 
Álvaro Alfredo Magaña Borja (1925–2001), interim president of El Salvador
Chico Borja (born 1959), U.S.-Ecuadorian soccer player-coach
Enrique Borja (born 1945), Mexican footballer
Félix Borja (born 1983), Ecuadorian footballer
Francisco de Borja (1441–1511), Spanish cardinal
Meliton Borja, Filipino chess master
Rodrigo Borja (born 1935), Ecuadorian president
Ian Kristoffer Borja (born 1996), Famous Singer Chose2

Given name 

Borja Prado (born 1956), Spanish businessman, former president of Endesa
Borja Cobeaga (born 1977), Spanish filmmaker
Borja Penalba (born 1975), Spanish composer
Borja Ekiza (born 1988), Spanish footballer
Borja Fernández (footballer, born 1981), Spanish footballer
Borja García (born 1982), Spanish racing driver
Borja García Freire (born 1990), Spanish footballer
Borja Iglesias (born 1993), Spanish footballer
Borja Mayoral, Spanish footballer
Borja Pérez (born 1982), Spanish footballer
Borja Valero (born 1985), Spanish footballer
Borja Bastón (born 1992), Spanish footballer

See also 
 House of Borgia, Valencian-Italian noble family powerful during the Renaissance

Spanish masculine given names